"Special Life!" is Kotoko's twelfth maxi single produced by I've Sound and Geneon Entertainment label. This single was released on May 21, 2008. The title track was used as the opening theme for the anime Kamen no Maid Guy. The single was sold as a regular edition (CD only) and a limited edition (CD+DVD) which contained the video for the title track.

Track listing 
"Special Life!"
Composition/Arrangement: C.G mix
Lyrics: Kotoko
"Capriccio: Kokoro wa Itsumo Kumori Nochi Hare"
Composition/Arrangement: Maiko Iuchi
Lyrics: Kotoko
"Special Life!" -instrumental-
"Capriccio: Kokoro wa Itsumo Kumori Nochi Hare" Instrumental

Charts and sales

References

2008 singles
Kotoko (singer) songs
Song recordings produced by I've Sound
Songs with lyrics by Kotoko (musician)
2008 songs